TPC River Highlands is a private golf club located in Cromwell, Connecticut, a suburb south of Hartford. It is part of the Tournament Players Club network operated by the PGA Tour. Since 1984, it has been the venue for the tour's annual Travelers Championship, previously known as the Buick Championship and Greater Hartford Open.

Former names
Middletown Golf Club (1928–34)
Edgewood Country Club (1934–84)
TPC of Connecticut (1984–89)

History
The club was founded in 1928 as Middletown Golf Club and became Edgewood Country Club in 1934. In the early 1980s it was bought by the PGA Tour. The golf course was redesigned to TPC standards by golf course architect Pete Dye, and reopened as the "TPC of Connecticut" in 1984. The course underwent further remodeling in 1989, this time by Bobby Weed in consultation with tour pros Howard Twitty and Roger Maltbie, and renamed the TPC at River Highlands.

Course record
The course record is 58 by PGA Tour pro Jim Furyk, which he shot during the final round of the 2016 Travelers Championship. A plaque, on the path beside the 18th green, commemorates his achievement, which is also the lowest 18-hole score in PGA Tour history. Previously, the record was held by amateur Patrick Cantlay, a 19-year-old collegian from UCLA, who set the course record of 60 at the Travelers Championship on June 24, 2011.

Scorecard

References

External links

Travelers Championship

Golf clubs and courses in Connecticut
Golf clubs and courses designed by Bobby Weed
Cromwell, Connecticut
Sports venues in Middlesex County, Connecticut
1928 establishments in Connecticut
Sports venues completed in 1928